XHTGO-FM/XETGO-AM is a radio station on 90.1 FM and 1100 AM in Guadalupe Victoria, Zacatecas, Mexico. The station is owned by NTR and known as Radio Cañón.

History
XETGO-AM 1100 received its concession in 1993, broadcasting with 5,000 watts day and 400 at night. XETGO was authorized to move to FM in 2011 and holds a continuity obligation for 28,648 otherwise unserved listeners to remain on AM.

Repeaters
In 2017, TV Zac, S.A. de C.V., a company co-owned with NTR, obtained concessions to build six new radio stations in Zacatecas, five of which signed on in June 2021 as rebroadcasters of XHTGO. All are required to use HD Radio, a commitment that was worth a point bonus in the IFT-4 auction.

References

Radio stations in Zacatecas
Radio stations established in 1993
Radio stations in Mexico with continuity obligations